The Copa Constitució or Andorran Cup is the national football cup competition in Andorra organized by the Andorran Football Federation.  The Cup annual tournament began in 1990.  Since the 1994–95 season, the tournament has been affiliated with FIFA and UEFA.

Champions
 

‡ Not official titles.

Performance by club

References

External links
Website of the Federation
 League321.com - National cup results.
Copa Constitució summary(SOCCERWAY)

 
Cup
Andorra
Recurring sporting events established in 1990
1990 establishments in Andorra